St Leonard's Church is parish church in Hythe, Kent. It was originally built in the late 11th century and is a Grade I listed building.

Building 
The large 11th-century church is up the hill; the tower at its eastern end was destroyed by an earth tremor in 1739 and restored in 1750.

On pillars on the south side of the nave is mediaeval graffiti depicting ships. The vestry door, on the north side of the nave is an early Norman doorway. It has been suggested that this, which in late mediaeval times was apparently on the outer wall of the church, was once an internal wall, with the earlier Norman church a stage higher up the hill. This would make the existing chapel of St Edmund (or north transept) the original chancel, with the original nave being on the other side of the north wall. Evidence of earlier masonry is visible on the north wall. Going round into the north transept, it is clear that Roman masonry was re-used in the building of the arch, which is narrow and late-Saxon in style. At the time of Hasted's 'History of Kent' this doorway was blocked up and not visible on the inside.

A new vestry was added in 1959.

History 
St Leonard's Church was originally completed in the late 11th Century.

Burials and memorials 
Lionel Lukin, credited with inventing the self-righting lifeboat, is buried in the parish churchyard.

Ossuary 
St Leonard's Church is one of only two churches in England to contain a surviving crypt/ossurary, the other being Holy Trinity church in Rothwell, Northamptonshire. It has "the largest and best-preserved collection of ancient human skulls and bones in Britain".
The chancel, from 1220, covers a processional ossuary (a bone store, more commonly found on the continent) lined with 2,000 skulls and 8,000 thigh bones. They date from the mediaeval period, probably having been stored after removal, to make way for new graves. This was common in England, but bones were usually dispersed, and this is thus a rare collection. Several of the skulls show marks of trepanning.

The ossuary is estimated to contain the remains of around 2000–4000 individuals.

Gallery

See also 
 Grade I listed buildings in Folkestone and Hythe

References 

Grade I listed churches in Kent